Pierre Joris (born July 14, 1946) is a Luxembourg-American poet, essayist, translator, and anthologist. He has moved between Europe, North Africa & the US for 55 years, publishing over 80 books of poetry, essays, translations & anthologies — most recently Fox-trails, -tales & -trots: Poems & Proses (Black Fountain Press), the translations Memory Rose into Threshold Speech: The Collected Earlier Poetry of Paul Celan (FSG) & Microliths: Posthumous Prose of Paul Celan (CMP) & A City Full of Voices: Essays on the Work of Robert Kelly. Earlier, Arabia (not so) Deserta (Essays, Spuyten Duyvil 2019), Conversations in the Pyrenees with Adonis (CMP 2018), & The Book of U/ Le livre des cormorans (with Nicole Peyrafitte, Simoncini 2017). 
{{Infobox person
| name                      = Pierre Joris
| image                     = PJbyNPeyrafitte.jpg
| image_size                = 
| alt                       = 
| caption                   = Pierre Joris by Nicole Peyrafitte, Upstate NY, 2019
| birth_date                = 
| birth_place               = Strasbourg, France
| death_date                = 
| death_place               = 
| citizenship               = Luxembourg & American
| education                 = Lyçée Classique Diekirch (Luxembourg) 1964
| alma_mater                = Bard College (AB, 1969)
| occupation                = poet, essayist, editor, translator
| years_active              = 
| employer                  = 
| notable_works             = ‘’Breccia: Selected Poems 1972-1986,’’ ‘’Poasis,” “A Nomad Poetics,’’ Barzakh’’
| style                     = 
| spouse                    = Nicole Peyrafitte
| children                  = Miles Joris-Peyrafitte (film director)
| relatives                 = 
| awards                    = 2020 Batty Weber Award for Lifetime Literary Achievement, Luxembourg.
| signature                 = 
| signature_alt             = 
| signature_size            = 
}}

Early life and education
Joris was born in Strasbourg, France on July 14, 1946 and raised in Ettelbruck, Luxembourg. He left Luxembourg at nineteen and since then has lived in the US, Great Britain, North Africa and France. After early studies in medicine in Paris, he decided to devote himself to literature, especially poetry, and to use English (his fourth language) as his writing language. In 1967 he moved to the US where he earned a BA (Honors) at Bard College before moving to New York City where he edited the underground arts magazine Corpus from 1969 to 1970. 
	After moving to London, England in late 1971, Joris founded the literary magazine Sixpack (with William Prescott) which published a wide range of innovative poetries and translations from the US, Europe and beyond, and was instrumental in helping to create what came to be known as the British Poetry Revival of the 1970s. In 1975, Sixpack received a grant from the CCLM (Coordinating Council of Little Magazines) as well as that year's Fel's Literary Award. 
	Between 1972 and 1975 Joris pursued graduate work, first in Cultural Studies at the University of London's Institute of United States Studies under the direction of Professor Eric Mottram, and then at Essex University where he earned an MA in the Theory and Practice of Literary Translation in 1975 under the guidance of visiting American poet Ted Berrigan. It was also in London, in 1972, that he published his first chapbook of poems (The Fifth Season).

Career
From 1976 to 1979 Joris taught in the English Department at the University of Constantine, Algeria, years that also led him to explore the wider Maghreb and especially the great Sahara desert. He moved back to London in 1979 & in the early eighties taught in various institutions, such as the University of Maryland’s UK campuses, while expanding his career as a freelance writer and translator, reviewing, for instance, for the New Statesman, for which publication he also briefly wrote a “Letter from Paris,” and working as editor and writer for the Third World weekly al-Zahaf al-Akhdar. Relocating to Paris, Joris started working as author, commentator, actor & editor for France Culture, the National French radio station. During those years he would return annually to the U.S. for poetry readings and work with various collaborators on a range of translation projects. 
	In 1987, invited by the Iowa International Writing Program (the first Luxemburger to be thus invited) to spend the fall in Iowa City, he used the occasion to relocate to the US. He first moved from Iowa to Binghamton, N.Y., where he started a Ph.D. in Comparative Literature he was to complete in 1990; from there he moved to San Diego where he was active as visiting poet in the University of California, San Diego Literature Department and would meet Nicole Peyrafitte. A range of projects got underway at this time: besides completing several collections of poems & a first volume of essays, Joris embarked on a very fruitful collaboration with poet and anthologist Jerome Rothenberg. In 1993 the pair co-edited and co-translated pppppp : THE SELECTED WRITINGS OF KURT SCHWITTERS (Temple University Press) which received the 1994 Pen Center USA West Award for Translation, and the following year a Selected Poems of Pablo Picasso, under the title The Death of the Count of Orgaz & Other Writings. Joris and Rothenberg also began work on a two volume anthology of 20th Century Avant-Garde writings, POEMS FOR THE MILLENNIUM: A UNIVERSITY OF CALIFORNIA BOOK OF MODERN & POSTMODERN POETRY, the first volume of which was published by UCP in 95 and the second in 98. 
	In 1992 Joris returned to the Mid-Hudson valley to take up a teaching post in the Department of English at the University at Albany, SUNY, where he taught until his retirement in 2013. In 2009 he moved to Bay Ridge, Brooklyn, where he lives with his wife Nicole Peyrafitte, a performance artist, painter & singer. The pair continue to work together in a range of ways, including performances with jazz musicians & co-teaching, for example in the summer sessions at the Jack Kerouac Institute at Naropa University in Boulder, Colorado. Peyrafitte has also illustrated and created covers for most of Joris’ books since 1992. They are presently involved in a series of collaborative performance actions under the title "Domopoetics Karstic Actions."

Selected publications

Poetry
Joris has published over 30 books and chapbooks of his own poetry, among these :Breccia: Selected Poems 1972-1986 (Editions PHI / Station Hill, 1987).Turbulence (St. Lazaire Press, Rhinebeck, 1991).Winnetou Old (Meow Press, Buffalo, NY, 1994).h.j.r. (EarthWind Press, Ann Arbor, 1999).Poasis: Selected Poems 1986-1999 (Wesleyan University Press, 2001).Aljibar (PHI, 2007), a bilingual edition with French translations by Eric Sarner.Aljibar II (PHI, 2008), again a bilingual edition with French translations by Eric Sarner.Meditations on the Stations of Mansur al-Hallaj (Chax Press, 2013).Barzakh (Poems 2000-2012) (Black Widow Press 2014).
 An American Suite (Inpatient Press 2016).The Book of U — Le livre des cormorant (with Nicole Peyrafitte. Editions Simoncini, Luxembourg 2017).Fox-trails, -tales & -trots (Poems & Proses) (Black Fountain Press, Luxembourg, 2020).

EssaysA Nomad Poetics (Wesleyan University Press) 2003.Justifying the Margins: Essays 1990-2006 (Salt Publishing) 2009.Arabia (Not So) Deserta (Essays on Maghrebi & Mashreqi Writing & Culture)Spuyten Duyvil 2019.Adonis & Pierre Joris: Conversations in the Pyrenees, CMP 2019

as editor:A City Full of Voices: Essays on Robert Kelly, ed. by Pierre Joris with Peter Cockelbergh & Joel Newberger (Contra Mundum Press 2020)A Voice Full of Cities: The Collected Essays of Robert Kelly, ed. by Pierre Joris & Peter Cockelbergh (Contra Mundum Press 2013)Claude Pélieu: La Crevaille (Posthumous Writings of Claude Pélieu, transcribed & edited by Pierre Joris) Ressacs, Editions de l’Arganier, Paris. (2008)Joy! Praise! A Festschrift for Jerome Rothenberg on the Occasion of his Sixtieth Birthday, Ta'wil Books & Documents, Encinitas, 1991.

 Pierre Joris in translation Canto Diurno — Choix de poèmes 1972-2014. Avant-dire de Charles Bernstein. Traduit de l'anglais par Jean Portante avec Glenda George, Michel Maire, Didier Pemerle et la collaboration de l'auteur. (Le Castor Astral 2017).Mawqif — Poemas y ensayos. Traducción y notas de Mario Domínguez Parra y Joseph Mulligan (Collection Temblor de cielo. LaOtra, Durango, Mexico, 2014)Fin de siècle-Phantombild — Ausgewählte Gedichte 1974-2000. Aus dem Amerikanischen Englisch von Nico Helminger. Mit Illustrationen von Nicole Peyrafitte. (Editions PHI, 2004)

TranslationsMemory Rose into Threshold Speech: The Collected Earlier Poetry of Paul Celan (Farrar, Straus & Giroux, 2020)Paul Celan: Microliths (Posthumous prose) (Contra Mundum Press 2020)Revolution goes through Walls, by Safaa Fathy (SplitLevel Texts 2018)Breathturn into Timestead: The Collected Later Poetry of Paul Celan (Farrar, Straus & Giroux, 2015)Exile is my Trade. A Habib Tengour Reader (Black Widow Press, 2012)Jukebox hydrogène de Allen Ginsberg (avec Nicole Peyrafitte 2008)4x1: Translations of Tristan Tzara, Rilke, Jean-Pierre Duprey and Habib Tengour (Inconundrum Press)Abdelwahab Meddeb: Malady of Islam (Basic Books)Habib Tengour: Empedokles's Sandal (Duration Press)
 Also noteworthy are his translations of Maurice Blanchot's The Unavowable Community and Edmond Jabès's From the Desert to the Book (Station Hill Press).
As well as his numerous translations from English into French: Jack Kerouac's Mexico City Blues, but also Carl Solomon, Gregory Corso, Pete Townshend, Julian Beck, Sam Shepard and most recently "Hydrogen Jukebox" by Allen Ginsberg (Libretto for 2009 French premiere of Philip Glass’ opera "Hydrogen Jukebox").

Miscellaneous:
In 2007 his CD Routes, Not Roots appeared, with Munir Beken (oud), Michael Bisio (bass), Ben Chadabe (percussion) & Mitch Elrod (guitar).

Celan translations
Joris has translated all the poetry of Paul Celan (except for the very early & the Rumanian-language posthumously published poems) into English (the first three volumes published by Green Integer and Sun&Moon Press); a "Selections" edition of Celan; and most recently his "Meridian" speech with materials:Lightduress (received the 2005 PEN Award for Poetry in Translation)(o.p.);Threadsuns; (o.p.);Breathturn (o.p.);Paul Celan: Selections;The Meridian: Final Version - Drafts - Materials (Stanford University Press)Breathturn into Timestead: The Complete Later Poetry of Paul Celan was published by Farrar, Straus & Giroux on December 2, 2014.Memory Rose into Threshold Speech: The Collected Earlier Poetry was published by Farrar, Straus & Giroux on November 24, 2020.Paul Celan: Microliths (Posthumous prose) (Contra Mundum Press, 2020)

Collaborations with Jerome Rothenberg
With Jerome Rothenberg he has published a two-volume anthology of 20th Century Avant-Garde writings, Poems for the Millennium: The University of California Book of Modern & Postmodern Poetry, (University of California Press) the first volume of which received the 1996 PEN Oakland/Josephine Miles Literary Award.

Rothenberg's & Joris's previous collaboration, pppppp: Selected Writings of Kurt Schwitters (Temple University Press, 1993, reissued in 2002 by Exact Change) was awarded the 1994 PEN Center USA West Literary Award for Translation.

Rothenberg & Joris also co-edited & co-translated The Burial of the Count of Orgaz & Other Writings of Pablo Picasso (Exact Change, 2004).

Anthologies
Joris's first anthology was the bi-lingual Matières d'Angleterre. Anthologie de la nouvelle poésie anglaise, co-edited with Paul Buck. (Les Trois Cailloux, 1984).

With Jean Portante he edited Poésie internationale in 1987.

Poems for the Millennium. The University of California Book of North African Poetry, edited by Joris and Habib Tengour was published in December 2012.

In the media
An issue of Samizdat commemorates the Joris/Rothenberg collaboration with original work and translations by both poets, and essays and poems for and about the poets.
 
In 2011, Peter Cockelbergh edited a book on Joris entitled Pierre Joris--Cartographies of the In-between (Litteraria Pragensia Press), with essays by, among others, Mohammed Bennis, Charles Bernstein, Nicole Brossard, Clayton Eshleman, Allen Fisher, Christine Hume, Regina Keil-Sagawe, Abdelwahab Meddeb, Jennifer Moxley, Carrie Noland, Alice Notley, Marjorie Perloff & Nicole Peyrafitte.

Performance art, theater, and collaborations
As reader and performance artist, Joris's work with performance artist / singer / painter Nicole Peyrafitte includes :

dePLACEments (premiered from 27 June to 2 July 2005 at Cave Poésie, Toulouse, France);
Manifesto&a (premiered in Luxembourg, July 1998);
Riding The Lines, (European Tour summer 1997; New York City performance at the Here Inn, Dec 1997).

Other performances include:
Domopoetics, a multimedia collaborative performance with Nicole Peyrafitte (since 2011).
Pierre's Words (Toward an Opera), a collaboration with composer Joel Chadabe & the Ellen Sinopoli Dance Company (Premiered May 3, 1997, The Egg, Albany);
Frozen Shadows, a dance & reading performance based on Winnetou Old, choreographed by Ellen Sinopoli & danced by the Ellen Sinopoli Dance Company (Union College, Schenectady, NY January 21, 1996 "The Egg," Albany, NY, April 12 & 13, 1995);
This Morning (part of Music Juggle) a multimedia collaboration with composer Xavier Chabot (Premiered at Rensselaer Polytechnic Institute, Troy, NY February 5, 1997. Chabot presented this work in Japan in late 1997.
 Joris's play The Agony of I.B., was commissioned and produced in June 2016 by the Théatre National du Luxembourg. It also had a staged reading at Torn Page in New York on 8 February 2020.

Personal life
He lives in Bay Ridge, Brooklyn, New York, with his wife, multimedia performance artist and writer Nicole Peyrafitte. He has one son, film director and writer Miles Joris-Peyrafitte.

References

External links

Rothenberg-Joris special issue of Samizdat
Two Poems by Pierre Joris @ Melancholia's Tremulous Dreadlocks
Pierre Joris on the book 'Heidegger and Fascism'
Interview with Pierre Joris
New Inquiry Interview
Pierre Joris' translations of poetry by Mostafa Nissaboury in New Poetry in Translation
Pierre Joris' translation of fiction by Abdallah Zrika in Words Without Borders

American male poets
French–English translators
American people of Luxembourgian descent
1946 births
Living people
Luxembourgian writers
Bard College alumni
State University of New York faculty
University at Albany, SUNY faculty
University of California, San Diego alumni
International Writing Program alumni
PEN Oakland/Josephine Miles Literary Award winners
People from Bay Ridge, Brooklyn
Writers from Brooklyn
American writers in French
20th-century American writers
21st-century American writers